Grover Cleveland Charter High School is a public school serving grades 9–12. Cleveland Humanities Magnet is part of Cleveland Charter High School. The school is located along the community of Reseda Ranch within the neighborhood of Reseda, in the San Fernando Valley portion of the city of Los Angeles, California. Cleveland offers certain pathways and academic programs to personalize learning to the students, allowing for self-exploration. Cleveland offers a Media Arts, Visual Arts, STEM, Performing Arts, Liberal Studies, and World Language pathway. Cleveland's academic programs include the Academy of Art and Technology (AOAT) and the School for Advanced Studies (SAS). It has two magnet programs including the Humanities Magnet and the Global Media Studies Magnet.

Cleveland, a part of the Los Angeles Unified School District, was named after President Grover Cleveland.

It was in the Los Angeles City High School District until 1961, when it merged into LAUSD.

In 2010, Cleveland High School was named one of the "Best High Schools in America" by Newsweek magazine and spotlighted for being in the top 3% of public high schools.

Academic programs 
The Academy of Art and Technology (AOAT) was established in 2004 at Cleveland High School. AOAT, a California Partnership Academy and California Lighthouse Academy, offers an art and technology-based education. Students are educated in graphic design, web design, and illustration. The programs mission is to provide all students with skills to succeed in the workforce and college.

The School for Advanced Studies (SAS) provides state-identified gifted students with a rigorous program of study that aligns with the UC system admission requirements. SAS offers students college-level studies in English, social sciences, mathematics, biological and physical sciences, and languages other than English. Students can choose from 23 Advanced Program courses and other on-campus college classes offered at Cleveland High School.

The Humanities Magnet was established in 1981. The curriculum explores the history and modern expressions of diverse ideas, multicultural ideas, and the functions of art through the ages. The Humanities program also known as CORE focuses on giving students an education based on our development, culture, diversity, and similar attributes.

The Global Media Studies Magnet (GMS) focuses on social justice themes and communication arts. Students learn to communicate their ideas through film and animations. Students learn to use media skills for the good of global community and our given the chance to engage with students around the world to explore current social issues.

Notable alumni

Sid Akins, baseball player, Olympian
Lucious Harris, former NBA player
Leslie-Anne Huff, actress
Victoria Justice, actress
Blair Levin, policy analyst and commentator
Harvey Levin, TMZ founder
Bret Saberhagen, former MLB pitcher
Charles Martin Smith, actor, director
Don Stark, actor
Nick Young, NBA player
Pamela Des Barres, rock and roll groupie
Patrisse Cullors, activist, co-founder Black Lives Matter

References
 "I'm With the Band" Pamela DesBarres:

External links
Cleveland High School website
Cleveland AOAT
Cleveland SAS
Humanities Magnet
Global Media Studies Magnet

Cleveland, Grover
High schools in the San Fernando Valley
Cleveland, Grover
Charter high schools in California
Reseda, Los Angeles
1959 establishments in California